Junqueiro is a municipality located in the Brazilian state of Alagoas. Its population is 24,722 (2020) and its area is 254.07 km².

References

Municipalities in Alagoas